The Relic of the Holy Blood was a medieval relic, said to contain some of the blood of Jesus Christ. It is different than the relic of the Precious Blood held in France.

The relic was sent from the Latin Patriarch of Jerusalem Robert of Nantes to Henry III of England in 1247, where it was then stored in the Church of the Holy Sepulchre in London, before being paraded through the streets by the King and laid to rest in Westminster Abbey. Henry promoted the relic as a focus for pilgrimages, but it did not prove popular.

References

Bibliography
 
 

Christian symbols
Relics associated with Jesus
Henry III of England
Catholic Church in England